Alfredo Cuadrado Freire (born 2 May 1969), commonly known as Alfredo Cuadrado, is a 5-a-side football player from Spain.

Personal 
Cuadrado was born on 2 May 1969 in Madrid. He has a disability: he is blind and is a B1 type sportsperson. He continued to live in Madrid in 2012.

In 2013, he was awarded the bronze Real Orden al Mérito Deportivo.

5-a-side football 
Cuadrado is affiliated with the DZ Malaga sport federation.

He played 5-a-side football at the 2004 Summer Paralympics.  His team finished third after they played Greece and, won 2–0.

In August 2011, Cuadrado was part of the Spanish team that competed in the Spanish organized International Futsal Friendly Tournament held in Madrid.  The team played against Argentina, England, Turkey, and Italy.

He competed in the 2010 World Championships where he represented Spain.   In 2011, he represented Spain in the Turkey hosted European Championships.  His team was faced Turkey, Russia and Greece in the group stage.

The Italian-hosted European Championships were played in June 2012, and were the last major competition for him and his team prior to the start of the Paralympic Games.  He was coached in the competition by Miguel Ángel Becerra, and participated in daily fitness activities to help with preparations for the Championship and Paralympic Games.  On 7 June he took a medical test to clear participation in the Paralympic Games.

Cuadrado played 5-a-side  football at the 2012 Summer Paralympics.  His team finished third after they played Argentina and, won 1–0.  The bronze medal game was watched by Infanta Elena and President of the Spanish Paralympic Committee.  In the team's opening game against Great Britain, the game ended in a 1–1 draw.

He was a member of the national team in 2013 and competed in the European Championships. The team faced Russia, Greece and France in the group stage. His team won their opener against Russia. His team went on to defeat France and finish first in the competition.

Notes

References

External links 
 
 

1973 births
Living people
Paralympic 5-a-side footballers of Spain
Paralympic bronze medalists for Spain
5-a-side footballers at the 2004 Summer Paralympics
5-a-side footballers at the 2012 Summer Paralympics
Medalists at the 2004 Summer Paralympics
Medalists at the 2012 Summer Paralympics
Visually impaired category Paralympic competitors
Sportspeople from Madrid
Paralympic medalists in football 5-a-side